Larissa Corriveau is a Canadian actress from Quebec. She is most noted for her performance in the film Ghost Town Anthology (Répertoire des villes disparus), for which she received a Canadian Screen Award nomination for Best Supporting Actress at the 8th Canadian Screen Awards and a Prix Iris nomination for Best Supporting Actress at the 21st Quebec Cinema Awards.

She has also appeared in the films Le Banquet, Polytechnique, Social Hygiene (Hygiène sociale) and Viking, and the television series Les Hauts et les bas de Sophie Paquin, Trauma and Léo.

She received a Canadian Screen Award nomination for Best Lead Performance in a Film at the 11th Canadian Screen Awards in 2023 for That Kind of Summer (Un été comme ça.

As a filmmaker she directed the short films The Lure of the Deep and À travers les bas, as well as music videos for Essaie pas and Chienvoler.

She is in a relationship to actor Maxim Gaudette, and gave birth to the couple's first child in 2019.

Filmography

References

External links

21st-century Canadian actresses
Canadian film actresses
Canadian television actresses
Canadian stage actresses
Canadian women film directors
Actresses from Quebec
Film directors from Quebec
French Quebecers
Living people
Canadian music video directors
Year of birth missing (living people)